Pass It On is the second studio album by Dutch singer-songwriter Douwe Bob. It was released in the Netherlands on 15 May 2015, through Universal Music Group. The album has peaked to number 1 on the Dutch Albums Chart. The album includes the single "Hold Me".

Singles
"Hold Me" was released as the lead single from the album on 16 January 2015. The song peaked to number 2 on the Dutch Singles Chart.

Track listing

Chart performance

Weekly charts

Year-end charts

Release history

References

2015 albums
Douwe Bob albums